Rawle Hamilton D. Barrow (21 September 1934 – 28 March 2014) was a Trinidad and Tobago sailor. He competed in the Flying Dutchman event at the 1964 Summer Olympics.

References

External links
 
 

1934 births
2014 deaths
Trinidad and Tobago male sailors (sport)
Olympic sailors of Trinidad and Tobago
Sailors at the 1964 Summer Olympics – Flying Dutchman
Place of birth missing
Pan American Games medalists in sailing
Medalists at the 1959 Pan American Games
Sailors at the 1959 Pan American Games
Pan American Games bronze medalists
Pan American Games bronze medalists for the British West Indies